Douglas, also known as Douglas Settlement is a settlement on East Falkland, in the Falkland Islands, on the west shore of Salvador Water.

References

Populated places on East Falkland